Devastator may refer to:

Geography
 Devastator Peak, a volcanic summit near the upper Lillooet River in the Pacific Ranges of the Coast Mountains in British Columbia, Canada

Vehicles 

 TBD Devastator, a World War II-era torpedo bomber
 USS Devastator (AM-318), a 1943 mine sweeper of the United States Navy
 USS Devastator (MCM-6), a 1988 mine sweeper of the United States Navy
 Devastator (truck), a monster truck on the USHRA circuit

Video games 

 Devastator (video game), a 1993 video game by Wolf Team
 Devastators, a 1988 video game by Konami

Fiction 
 Devastator (Transformers), a Transformer "combiner" that is made up of Constructicons
 Devastator, the House Harkonnen forces' heaviest vehicle in the Dune video game Emperor: Battle for Dune
 Devastator (comics), a name shared by two Marvel Comics characters
 Devos the Devastator, another unrelated Marvel Comics character
 Devastator, the Star Destroyer that chases Princess Leia's ship in the opening sequence of Star Wars Episode IV: A New Hope
 World Devastator, a Star Wars planetary weapon that first appeared in Star Wars: Dark Empire
 Devastator, a rocket-launching weapon available in Duke Nukem 3D
 Devastator, a rocket-launching weapon available in the original Ratchet & Clank
 Devastator, a rocket-launching weapon available in Serious Sam 3: BFE
 Devastator, a fictional plane in Crimson Skies and Crimson Skies: High Road to Revenge
 A Space marine Devastator squad in Warhammer 40,000 tabletop game

Other uses 
 Jennings / Bear Devastator Crossbow
 Devastator (album), 2020 studio album by Phantom Planet

See also 
 The Devastator (disambiguation)